La Malfa is a surname. Notable people with the surname include:

Giorgio La Malfa (born 1939), Italian politician
Ugo La Malfa (1903–1979), Italian politician

See also
Doug LaMalfa (born 1960), American politician

Surnames of Italian origin